Miscera micrastra is a moth in the family Brachodidae. It was described by Edward Meyrick in 1907. It is found in Australia.

References

Brachodidae
Moths described in 1907